The Dr. Frank R. Burroughs House, located in Ritzville, Washington, United States, is a house listed on the National Register of Historic Places.  The house, now hosting the Frank R. Burroughs Home Museum, is owned by the city and open for tours.

See also
 National Register of Historic Places listings in Washington

References

External links
 
 Frank R. Burroughs Home Museum - City of Ritzville

1890 establishments in Washington (state)
Historic house museums in Washington (state)
Houses completed in 1890
Houses in Adams County, Washington
Houses on the National Register of Historic Places in Washington (state)
Museums in Adams County, Washington
National Register of Historic Places in Adams County, Washington